Beatrice Bruske (born January 22, 1969) is a Canadian labour leader and the current President of the Canadian Labour Congress, an organization that advocates on behalf of three million working people across Canada.

Bruske was elected President June 18, 2021, at the Canadian Labour Congress's first virtual convention. The convention was originally scheduled to be held in Vancouver in May 2020 but was delayed due to COVID-19.

Bruske is only the second woman to hold the position; the first was Shirley Carr (1986–1992).

In 2022 Bruske was named to Maclean's "Power List", the magazine's ranking of the country's 50 most powerful people in Canada. Bruske is active in national and the international labour movement and participated in the G7's Labour7 which fights for the rights and interests of working people.

Early life

Bruske emigrated to Winnipeg, Manitoba as a child. Her family left West Berlin, Germany, in 1981, because her father was offered an engineering job with Teshmont Consultants in Manitoba. At 16, she was hired as a part-time grocery clerk at a Westfair grocery store in Winnipeg and became a member of United Food and Commercial Workers union (UFCW) UFCW Local 832. In 1987, Westfair staff across Manitoba went on strike for 125 days, giving Bruske her start in Canada's labour movement. After the Westfair strike, Bruske became a shop steward with UFCW Local 832.

Bruske went on to become a member of the health and safety committee for Local 832 and subsequently was elected to be Vice-President of the local's executive board. She served as the local's Secretary-Treasurer, where she was responsible for administering the largest private-sector union local in Manitoba. Bruske was elected Vice-President of the UFCW Canada National Council, where she helped set the strategic direction for the national union.

2021 federal election

During the 2021 Canadian federal election, the Bruske CLC launched a mobilization campaign that advocated for a post-Covid-19 economic recovery plan centred on workers. Under Bruske, the CLC choose not to endorse a party, but instead campaigned for individual candidates.

During the campaign, Bruske was active in the media advocating on key labour issues and holding parties to account for their proposals. Precarious jobs in the gig economy, such as those offered by companies like Uber, became a prominent issue and the CLC pushed for better protections for these workers.

Political career
Bruske ran as the candidate in Fort Whyte for the Manitoba NDP in the 2019 provincial election. Bruske earned 17.9 per cent of the vote, coming in second to sitting Premier Brian Pallister. She also served as a member of the Executive of the Manitoba NDP.

Personal life
Bruske is a graduate of the University of Manitoba's labour studies program. She has two adult children.

Electoral record

References 

1969 births
Living people
Presidents of the Canadian Labour Congress
Canadian women trade unionists
Trade unionists from Manitoba
New Democratic Party of Manitoba politicians
University of Manitoba alumni
United Food and Commercial Workers people
German emigrants to Canada